Paint It Golden is the third album by Lydia. It is their first album after coming back from hiatus and was released on October 4, 2011.

History
On May 17, 2011 it was announced that after a year long hiatus, Leighton and Craig would bring back the band to record a new album under the same name.

They released the song and music video for "Dragging Your Feet in the Mud" on September 26, 2011. The music video for "Best Nights" was released on July 7, 2012.

Track listing

Notes
 The title of the album was taken from a line in the song "Eat Your Heart Out".
 Tracks 1, 4, and 5 were acoustically re-recorded and released on the band's 2012 Acoustics EP.

References

External links
 Paint it Golden Preorder

Lydia (band) albums
2011 albums